José Luis Pérez-Payá Soler (28 March 1928 – 12 August 2022), was a Spanish footballer who played as a forward. He was also president of the Royal Spanish Football Federation from 1970 until 1975.

Payá died on 12 August 2022, at the age of 94.

Career statistics

Club

References

External links 
 

1928 births
2022 deaths
Spanish footballers
Spain international footballers
Association football forwards
Segunda División players
La Liga players
SD Deusto players
CD Alcoyano footballers
Barakaldo CF footballers
Real Sociedad footballers
Atlético Madrid footballers
Real Madrid CF players
People from Alcoy
Sportspeople from the Province of Alicante
Presidents of the Spanish Football Federation